Roman Mavlanov  ( (born 5 July 1994) is a Russian racing driver.

Career

Karting
Born in Moscow, Mavlanov began his racing career in karting at the age of 13 in the Russian cups, collecting titles in various classes.

Formula Renault
Mavlanov made his début in single-seaters in 2011, competing in the Eurocup Formula Renault 2.0 and Formula Renault 2.0 Alps for the Boëtti Racing Team. He ended his Eurocup season without any point-scoring finishes, while in the Alps series, he had ten point-scoring finishes from sixteen races.

Mavlanov switched to Tech 1 Racing in 2012, again competing in both the Eurocup Formula Renault and Formula Renault 2.0 Alps. In the Eurocup he failed to score any points again, while in the Alps series, he degraded to five point-scoring finishes.

Mavlanov joined RC Formula for both the Formula Renault 2.0 NEC and the Eurocup Formula Renault series. In the NEC series he scored his first Formula Renault 2.0 podium, while in the Eurocup, he recorded his worst season with three disqualifications and was excluded from the final round at Barcelona.

International GT Open
Mavlanov made his sports car racing debut in the GTS class of the International GT Open in 2013, racing for SMP Racing - Russian Bears. He finished fourth in the GTS standings with three class wins.

Formula Renault 3.5 Series
Mavlanov will move to Formula Renault 3.5 Series in 2014 with Zeta Corse.

Racing record

Career summary

Complete Formula Renault 3.5 Series results
(key) (Races in bold indicate pole position) (Races in italics indicate fastest lap)

References

External links
 

Living people
1994 births
Russian racing drivers
Formula Renault Eurocup drivers
Formula Renault 2.0 Alps drivers
Formula Renault 2.0 NEC drivers
International GT Open drivers
World Series Formula V8 3.5 drivers
Blancpain Endurance Series drivers
24 Hours of Spa drivers
Sportspeople from Moscow
GP3 Series drivers
Tech 1 Racing drivers
SMP Racing drivers
Zeta Corse drivers
24H Series drivers
RC Formula drivers
Lamborghini Super Trofeo drivers